Aukštkalniai ('high mounts', formerly ) is a village in Kėdainiai district municipality, in Kaunas County, in central Lithuania. According to the 2011 census, the village had a population of 6 people.

Demography

References

Villages in Kaunas County
Kėdainiai District Municipality